The following is the list of squads for each of the 16 teams competing in the EuroBasket 1999, held in France between 21 June and 3 July 1999. Each team selected a squad of 12 players for the tournament.

Group A

France

Israel

Macedonia

FR Yugoslavia

Group B

Hungary

Russia

Slovenia

Spain

Group C

Bosnia and Herzegovina

Croatia

Italy

Turkey

Group D

Czech Republic

Germany

Greece

Lithuania

References
 1999 European Championship for Men, FIBA.com.
 European Championship 1999 - National Squads, LinguaSport.com.

1999